Anna Van Bellinghen, sometimes written as Anna Vanbellinghen (born 10 March 1994) is a Belgian weightlifter. She is a silver medalist at the European Weightlifting Championships. She also represented Belgium at the 2020 Summer Olympics in Tokyo, Japan.

Career 

She represented Belgium at the 2013 Summer Universiade held in Kazan, Russia and she finished in 12th place in the women's 75kg event. In 2015, she won the bronze medal in the Clean & Jerk in the women's under-23 +75kg event at the European Junior & U23 Weightlifting Championships held in Klaipeda, Lithuania. In that year, she also competed in the women's +75 kg event at the 2015 World Weightlifting Championships held in Houston, United States.

In 2017, she represented Belgium at the Summer Universiade held in Taipei, Taiwan in the women's 90 kg event. She finished in 5th place. A few months later, she won the bronze medal in the women's under-23 90kg event at the 2017 European Junior & U23 Weightlifting Championships held in Durrës, Albania. In that same year, she also competed in the women's 90 kg event at both the 2017 European Weightlifting Championships  held in Split, Croatia and the 2017 World Weightlifting Championships held in Anaheim, United States.

She competed in the women's 90kg event at the 2018 European Weightlifting Championships held in  Bucharest, Romania. A few months later, she won the gold medal in the women's 90kg event at the FISU World University Weightlifting Championships held in Biała Podlaska, Poland. She also competed in the women's 81 kg event at the 2018 World Weightlifting Championships held in Ashgabat, Turkmenistan.

At the 2019 European Weightlifting Championships held in Batumi, Georgia, she won the bronze medal in the women's 81kg event. This became the silver medal after disqualification of the original gold medalist Eleni Konstantinidi of Greece. She also won the gold medal in the Snatch event and, as a result of the disqualification, the bronze medal in the Clean & Jerk. At the British International Open 2019 held in Coventry, Great Britain, she won the bronze medal in the women's 87kg event. In that same year, she also competed in the women's 81 kg event at the 2019 World Weightlifting Championships held in Pattaya, Thailand without winning a medal. In this competition, she lifted 99kg in the Snatch event but failed to register a successful result in the Clean & Jerk.

In 2020, she won the bronze medal in the women's 81kg event at the Roma 2020 World Cup in Rome, Italy. She also won the bronze medals in the Snatch and Clean & Jerk events. In 2021, she finished in 7th place in the women's +87kg event at the European Weightlifting Championships held in Moscow, Russia.

She represented Belgium at the 2020 Summer Olympics in Tokyo, Japan. She finished in 11th place in the women's +87 kg event. In December 2021, she finished in 7th place in the women's 81 kg event at the World Weightlifting Championships held in Tashkent, Uzbekistan.

Achievements

References

External links 
 
 

Living people
1994 births
Place of birth missing (living people)
Belgian female weightlifters
Olympic weightlifters of Belgium
Competitors at the 2013 Summer Universiade
Competitors at the 2017 Summer Universiade
European Weightlifting Championships medalists
Weightlifters at the 2020 Summer Olympics
21st-century Belgian women